Simaria Assembly constituency is an assembly constituency in  the Indian state of Jharkhand. The seat was created ahead of the 1977 Bihar Legislative Assembly election, being carved out of the Hazaribagh seat. Simaria is located in the Chatra Lok Sabha constituency.

Members of Assembly 
2005: Upendra Nath Das, Bharatiya Janata Party
2008: Ram Chandra Ram, Communist Party of India (by-election)
2009: Jay Prakash Singh Bhogta, Jharkhand Vikas Morcha (Prajatantrik)
2014: Ganesh Ganjhu, Jharkhand Vikas Morcha (Prajatantrik)
2015: Ganesh Ganjhu, Bharatiya Janata Party
 2019: Kishun Kumar Das, Bharatiya Janata Party

See also
Vidhan Sabha
List of states of India by type of legislature

References

Assembly constituencies of Jharkhand